Steve or Stephen Simpson may refer to:

 Steve Simpson (mathematician) (born 1945), American logician
 Steve Simpson (baseball) (1948–1989), Major League Baseball pitcher
 Steve Simpson (wrestler) (born 1963), former wrestler in South Africa and the United States
 Steve Simpson (rugby league) (born 1979), Australian rugby league player
 Stephen Simpson (born 1984), South African racing driver
 Stephen Simpson (writer) (1789–1854), American author
 Stephen Simpson (doctor) (1793–1869), Australian pioneer
 Stephen Simpson (professor) (born 1957), Australian academic at the University of Sydney

See also
 Steven Lewis Simpson, independent film and documentary filmmaker